Southwick is a former village and now a suburb on the north banks of the River Wear in the city of Sunderland in the county of Tyne and Wear, historically in County Durham. From 1894 to 1928, Southwick was administered by the Southwick-on-Wear Urban District Council, before being absorbed by Sunderland.

Southwick borders with Castletown and Hylton Red House to the west, Monkwearmouth to the east, greenbelt farmland and the suburb of Carley Hill to the north, and the Wear to the south although the Queen Alexandra Bridge links Southwick to Pallion and central Sunderland.

It is home to a police station that services the north of Sunderland. There is a primary school, but no secondary school.   Sunderland A.F.C.'s Stadium of Light is visible to the east on the Monkwearmouth side.

Southwick is centered on its village green, a commercial area containing three listed buildings; a World War II war memorial, The Tramcar Inn a public house built in 1906, and a memorial lamp-post built in 1912. 

According to Indices of Deprivation published by the Department of the Environment, Transport and the Regions in 2000, Southwick is the most deprived of the 25 wards in Sunderland, the fifth most deprived in Tyne and Wear, and the fifty-fifth in England. .

History
Quarrying has taken place in the area for many centuries but it was not until the 17th century that large quarries were built and production substantially increased.  Wagonways were built to transport limestone from the quarries.

1698 saw the establishment of glassmaking in Southwick with the opening of Suddick Glasshouse.  This was followed by Wearmouth Crown Glassworks in 1786.  Southwick Bottleworks was a significant employer from 1846 to 1917.

Although it is likely that shipbuilding had taken place earlier the first registered shipbuilder was Henry Debord who was in business from 1785 to 1797. William Pickersgill & Sons Ltd opened a shipyard in Southwick in 1845.  At the time of a company merger with Austin's in 1954 the yard was redeveloped at a cost of £3 million.  It closed in 1988.

Etymology
Southwick in Sunderland has a different origin to other places called Southwick: the name is of Scandinavian origin: and means "clearing by a marsh", from Old Norse sogr "moss, marsh, swamp (cf. modern "soggy")" and þveit/thveit "thwaite, clearing". The name was recorded as Suvveite in 1189.

References

City of Sunderland suburbs
Sunderland